Kim Do-hoon (born 11 April 1989) is a South Korean professional golfer. He is also called Kim Do-hoon 753 to distinguish him from another South Korean golfer also called Kim Do-hoon, 753 being his membership number at the Korea Professional Golfers' Association. He won twice on the Korean Tour, the 2010 Tomato Savings Bank Open and the 2013 Munsingwear Matchplay Championship.

Amateur career
In December 2006, Kim was part of the South Korean team that won the gold medal in the men's team event at the 2006 Asian Games.

Professional career
Kim turned professional in 2007. He played mostly on the Korean Tour but played on the Japan Golf Tour in 2009, finishing tied for 7th in the Kansai Open. He had two wins on the Korean Tour, the 2010 Tomato Savings Bank Open and the 2013 Munsingwear Matchplay Championship. He was a runner-up in the 2009 SK Telecom Open, the 2012 Dongbu Insurance Promy Open and in the 2013 GS Caltex Maekyung Open, an event co-sanctioned with the OneAsia Tour. His best season was 2013 when he finished fourth in the tour points list and third in prize money.

Professional wins (2)

Korean Tour wins (2)

References

External links

South Korean male golfers
Japan Golf Tour golfers
Asian Games medalists in golf
Asian Games gold medalists for South Korea
Golfers at the 2006 Asian Games
Medalists at the 2006 Asian Games
1989 births
Living people